Pott is a surname of Old English origin, which is a variant of Potts. The surname Pott may refer to:

Aaron Pott (born 1967), American winemaker
Alfred Pott (1822–1908), British archdeacon
Alida Jantina Pott (1888–1931), Dutch artist
August Pott (1802–1887), German linguist
Carol Pott (born 1964), American writer
Constance Mary Pott (1862–1957), English
Francis Pott (composer) (born 1957), British musician
Francis Lister Hawks Pott (1864–1947), American educator
Fritz Pott (1939–2015), German football player 
George F. Pott Jr. (1943–2001), American politician
Gladys Pott (1867–1961), English anti-suffragist and civil servant
Herbert Pott (1883–1953), British Olympic diver
Joel Pott (born 1979), British musician
Johann Heinrich Pott (1692–1777), Prussian physician and chemist
John Pott (died 1645), English doctor and politician
Johnny Pott (born 1935), American golfer
Joseph Pott (1759–1847), British archdeacon 
Karel Pott (1904–1953), Portuguese Olympic sprinter
Nellie Pott (1899–1963), American baseball pitcher
H. Percivall Pott (1908–1964), British politician
Percivall Pott (1714–1788), British surgeon
Reginald H. Pott (1870–1957), British politician and stockbroker

Fiction
Caractacus Pott, fictional character in the Ian Fleming novel Chitty-Chitty-Bang-Bang
Jack Pott, fictional character in the comics Cor!! and Buster

See also
Pott (disambiguation)
Potter (name)
Potts (disambiguation)

Surnames of British Isles origin